Lobulia vogelkopensis, or the Vogelkop moss skink, is a species of skink found in Western New Guinea, Indonesia.

References

Lobulia
Reptiles described in 2021
Reptiles of Indonesia
Endemic fauna of Indonesia